This is the list of Schedule I drugs as defined by the United States Controlled Substances Act. The following findings are required for drugs to be placed in this schedule:
 The drug or other substance has a high potential for abuse.
 The drug or other substance has no currently accepted medical use in treatment in the United States.
 There is a lack of accepted safety for use of the drug or other substance under medical supervision.

Except as specifically authorized, it is illegal for any person:
 to manufacture, distribute, or dispense, or possess with intent to manufacture, distribute, or dispense, a controlled substance; or
 to create, distribute, dispense, or possess with intent to distribute or dispense, a counterfeit substance.

Additional substances are added to the list by the Secretary of Health and Human Services pursuant to 21 CFR 1308.49.

The complete list of Schedule I drugs follows. The Administrative Controlled Substances Code Number for each drug is included.

Opioids

Opium derivatives

Hallucinogenic or psychedelic substances

Depressants

Stimulants

Cannabimimetic agents

References

External links 
 Controlled Substances listed by the DEA

|

Controlled Substances Act
Drug-related lists
Cannabis-related lists